Chilobrachys nitelinus, is a species of spider of the genus Chilobrachys. It is endemic to Sri Lanka.

See also
 List of Theraphosidae species

References

External links
Chilobrachys nitelinus Karsch 1891, female, Sri Lanka

Theraphosidae
Endemic fauna of Sri Lanka
Spiders of Asia
Spiders described in 1892